Upstairs Downstairs is a British drama series, broadcast on BBC One from 2010 to 2012, and co-produced by BBC Wales and Masterpiece. Created and written by Heidi Thomas, it is a continuation of the London Weekend Television series of the same name, which ran from 1971 to 1975 on ITV.

The series resumes the story of 165 Eaton Place in 1936 London, six years after the original series concluded. Jean Marsh reprises her role as Rose Buck, who becomes housekeeper of the re-established household, with Ed Stoppard and Keeley Hawes playing its new owners Sir Hallam and Lady Agnes Holland. The first series, consisting of three episodes, was broadcast across consecutive nights during Christmas 2010. The second series consists of six episodes, first aired between 19 February 2012 and 25 March 2012. The series ends at the outbreak of the Second World War in 1939.

Production history

Series 1
In October 2009, it was announced that the BBC was to revive the series as two 90-minute episodes to be broadcast on BBC One in the autumn of 2010, written by Heidi Thomas and set in 1936, six years after the original series finished.

The original series had concluded at the time of the Great Depression in 1930, with the Bellamy family having lost all its money in the crash of 1929. James Bellamy, the only son of Richard, Viscount Bellamy, had been responsible for persuading not only his family but also the faithful family servant, Rose Buck, to invest all their money in the stock market. Consequently, James committed suicide and the Bellamy family, as well as all the servants, left Eaton Place to start new lives. Mr. Hudson, the butler, and Mrs. Bridges, the cook, married and moved to the seaside, taking the kitchen maid, Ruby Finch, to live with them; Edward, the chauffeur, and his wife Daisy, the maid, were given new positions by the Bellamys' cousin, Georgina, and her husband, Lord Stockbridge, in their new country house; and Rose was offered a job as maid to Lord and Lady Bellamy at their small villa.

The new series sees Jean Marsh, as the only original cast member from the LWT series, reprising the role of Rose Buck. She now runs a domestic service agency, after having spent time away nursing a relative in the country. She returns to 165 Eaton Place as housekeeper to the new owners, the Holland family.

There are no explanations as to what has happened to the previous owners or their staff during the intervening six-year period. In the first instalment, the Bellamy family and the original staff are only fleetingly referenced when Mrs Thackeray, the new cook, refers to 165 Eaton Place as "the Bellamy house". However, Rose does mention Lord Bellamy as "the late", meaning he has died by 1936. Rose also mentions that a silver teapot, seen in some scenes of the first episode, was given to her as a gift by Lord Bellamy in appreciation of her years of "impeccable" service to the family. In another scene when Lady Agnes gives Rose the keys to the wine cellar, she mentions that they bear the name of Mr. Hudson on a label.

In August 2010, the BBC announced that the planned two 90-minute shows would instead be three-hour-long episodes, with Keeley Hawes, Ed Stoppard, Eileen Atkins, Anne Reid, Claire Foy, Adrian Scarborough, Art Malik, Ellie Kendrick, Blake Ritson, and Nico Mirallegro joining Jean Marsh in the cast. Filming began in Cardiff in the middle of August 2010, with parts of the city transformed into 1930s Belgravia for exterior scenes, and the interiors shot in the BBC's Llandaff studios in Cardiff. Further filming of exterior scenes took place in Leamington Spa, Warwickshire, in September 2010, with a terrace in Clarendon Square doubling up as Eaton Place.

The new Upstairs Downstairs was made in-house by BBC Wales as a co-production with Masterpiece on PBS, and was broadcast on BBC1 with the first episode shown on 26 December 2010. A soundtrack album of music from the new series by composer Daniel Pemberton was released on iTunes. The three episodes were picked up by overseas broadcasters, including ABC in Australia, NRK in Norway, Sky in New Zealand, DR in Denmark, YLE in Finland, IBA in Israel, and TV4 in Sweden.

Series 2
BBC1 commissioned six 60-minute episodes of the drama to be broadcast in 2012, with Stoppard, Hawes, Reid, Foy, Malik, Ritson, Mirallegro, Scarborough and Jackson all returning to the series. Sarah Gordy and Alexia James, introduced during series 1 as Hallam's sister Pamela, who has Down's Syndrome, and the household's Jewish ward Lotte, respectively, also continue to appear on a recurring basis. Eileen Atkins does not appear in series 2, having stated in the press that she was unhappy with the development of her character of Hallam's mother Maud; so Maud is said to have died in the time between the first and second series. Ellie Kendrick also left the cast, with the character of Ivy replaced in the household by Eunice McCabe (Ami Metcalf). The relationship between Eunice and Mrs Thackeray, the cook, is quite similar to the interaction between Ruby the kitchen maid (played by Jenny Tomasin) and Mrs Bridges the cook (played by Angela Baddeley) in the original 1971 series.

Jean Marsh, after suffering from a stroke and heart attack, was unable to attend the majority of filming for the series; scripts were altered shortly before filming to accommodate her absence. On-screen, Rose is confined to a sanatorium after contracting tuberculosis, and appears in just two scenes over the series.

Other new additions to the cast include Alex Kingston as Blanche Mottershead, the younger half-sister of Maud, and Laura Haddock as maid Beryl Ballard. Special guest stars in the series include Kenneth Cranham as Sergeant Ashworth, Michael Landes as American multimillionaire Caspar Landry, Emilia Fox as Blanche's lover Lady Portia Alresford, and Sarah Lancashire as Violet Whisset, a love interest for the butler Mr Pritchard.

Characters

Upstairs

Downstairs

Plot
Sir Hallam Holland, a young diplomat, moves into the townhouse along with his wife, Lady Agnes, in January 1936 shortly before the death of King George V. They engage former parlourmaid Rose Buck, now running her own agency for domestic servants, to find them staff as they renovate the house to its former glory after its years of being mothballed.

As they settle into London life, they are joined by Lady Agnes' fiery young debutante sister Lady Persephone; Sir Hallam's overbearing widowed mother Maud, who moves herself into the house along with secretary and pet monkey, and a young, barely-trained house staff serving under a reluctant housekeeper. Added to these stresses are the still-painful memory of Lady Agnes's past miscarriage, a mystery surrounding Sir Hallam's sister, who died very young, and a surprise foster-child whom they feel obliged to maintain. The new downstairs staff slowly begin to pull together as a unit, overcoming differences of class and background as they come to know one another's stories.

Episodes

Series overview

Series 1 (2010)
The first series aired in the UK in December 2010. These episodes were featured in the U.S. on PBS's Masterpiece Classic in April 2011. VisionTV in Canada premiered the episodes in October 2011. ABC1 in Australia began airing the series on 4 December 2011.

This series was set in 1936.

Series 2 (2012)
This series was set from 1938 to 1939.

Reception
Series 1 was aired in the UK over three consecutive nights commencing 26 December 2010. It was a substantial ratings success, garnering viewing figures of 8.85, 8.13 and 8.18 million respectively and winning in its slot against all seasonal competition. The programme was nominated for six Primetime Emmy awards in 2011.

The second series of six episodes began on 19 February 2012, with an audience of 7.78 million, but by the time it ended on 25 March, the viewing figures had dropped to 5.22 million. It was confirmed on 21 April 2012 that Upstairs Downstairs would not be returning for a third series.

Soundtrack
Composer Carl Davis was brought in for the second series, composing new incidental music, occasionally using elements from Alexander Faris's original theme for the original 1971 series – which was popularised as a single release by Mantovani. Davis's music was released as a soundtrack album and was nominated for the Ivor Novello Awards in 2013, but did not win.

References

External links
 
 
 

 
Fiction set in 1936
Fiction set in 1938
Fiction set in 1939
2010 British television series debuts
2010s British drama television series
2012 British television series endings
BBC Cymru Wales television shows
BBC television dramas
English-language television shows
Fictional servants
Television shows set in London
Television series by BBC Studios
Television series set in the 1930s
Works about social class
British historical television series